Cercina is a genus of Asian grasshoppers in the subfamily Caryandinae (it was placed previously in the Oxyinae) first described by
Carl Stål (1833–1878), a Swedish entomologist.  Species records (probably incomplete) are from Sri Lanka, Nepal and Thailand.

Species include:
 Cercina mussoriensis Prasad & Sinha, 1956
 Cercina obtusa Stål, 1878 - type species
 Cercina phillipsi Henry, 1933

References

Acrididae genera
Taxa named by Carl Stål
Orthoptera of Asia